James Cook High School is a state co-ed secondary school in the South Auckland suburb of Manurewa, New Zealand.

School structure
The school's colours are royal blue and gold.

History

James Cook High School was opened in February 1968. Like most New Zealand state secondary schools of the era, the school was constructed to the Nelson Two-Storey standard plan, characterised by its two-storey H-shaped classroom blocks.

ERO findings
As of 2017 the school is struggling to meet students' needs when it comes to learning. The Education Review Office (ERO) had suggested external intervention to override the obstacles the school is facing.

Between 2014 and 2016, the National Certificates of Education Achievement (NCEA) had observed some declining in student enrollment and suggested external intervention method to ERO. In 2016, New Zealand Qualifications Authority suggested to improve student participation level to meet its quality standards.

Demographics
According to a 2017 ERO report, the school gender balance is even. The school's racial composition is 46% Māori, 22% Samoan, 7% Tongan, 4% Indian, 1% Niue and 16% other. Pākehā and Middle Eastern make up 2% each.

Notable alumni

 Stephen Berry – politician and political commentator
 Mavina Davis, Maybelle Galuvao, and Lavina Williams – singers, members of Ma-V-Elle
 Scott Dixon – motor racing driver
 Joe Galuvao – rugby league footballer 
 Gustavia Lui – businesswoman 
 Lelia Masaga – rugby union player
 Joe Rokocoko – rugby union player
 J Williams – singer and entertainer

References

External links
School website

Educational institutions established in 1968
Secondary schools in Auckland
New Zealand secondary schools of Nelson plan construction
1968 establishments in New Zealand